The Clare and Gilbert Valleys Council is a local government area located in the Yorke and Mid North region of South Australia. The council was founded on 1 July 1997 with the amalgamation of the District Council of Clare, the District Council of Riverton and the District Council of Saddleworth and Auburn. The council seat is located at Clare; it also maintains branch offices at Riverton and Saddleworth.

Geography
It includes the towns and localities of Anama, Armagh, Auburn, Barinia, Benbournie, Black Springs, Bungaree, Boconnoc Park, Clare, Emu Flat, Giles Corner, Gillentown, Hill River, Hilltown, Leasingham, Manoora, Marrabel, Mintaro, Penwortham, Polish Hill River, Rhynie, Riverton, Saddleworth, Sevenhill, Spring Farm, Spring Gully, Stanley, Stanley Flat, Steelton, Stockport, Tarlee, Tarnma, Tothill Belt, Tothill Creek, Undalya, Waterloo, Watervale and Woolshed Flat, and parts of Alma, Farrell Flat, Halbury, Hoyleton and Salter Springs.

Councillors
The Clare and Gilbert Valleys Council has a directly elected mayor.

See also
 Clare Valley
 Gilbert River
 List of parks and gardens in rural South Australia

References

External links
 Clare and Gilbert Valleys Council

Clare and Gilbert Valleys
Mid North (South Australia)